East Executive Avenue Northwest (commonly known as "East Executive Avenue") is a closed street in Washington, D.C. that, as of 2017, functions as a service road for authorized vehicles making deliveries to the White House, to which it is adjacent. Constructed in the 1870s, it is a short, north–south road that sits between the White House and the United States Treasury Building. The street was closed to public traffic in 1986 due to security concerns.

See also
 West Executive Avenue

References

Streets in Washington, D.C.
White House